The Chapman Lake is a vast expanse of freshwater in the central part of the Gouin Reservoir, in the territory of the town of La Tuque, in Haute-Mauricie, in the administrative region of Mauricie, in the province of Quebec, in Canada.

This bay extends into the cantons of Chapman (northern part), Huguenin (southern part) and Nevers (eastern part). Following
the completion of the Gouin Dam in 1948, the current form of Chapman Lake was shaped by the raising of the Gouin Reservoir. The water level varies significantly, being dependent on the Gouin Dam.

Recreotourism activities are the main economic activity of the sector. Forestry comes second.

A road branch connecting to the South at route 400 serves the southern portion of Chapman Lake and the southwestern portion of "Lac des Cinq Milles". The route 400 connects the Gouin Dam to the village of
Some secondary forest roads are in use nearby for forestry and recreational tourism activities.

The surface of Chapman Lake is usually frozen from mid-November to the end of April, but safe ice circulation is generally from early December to the end of March.

Geography

Toponymy
The term "Chapman" is a family name of English origin.

The toponym "lac Chapman" was formalized on December 18, 1986, by the Commission de toponymie du Québec.

Notes and references

See also 

Lakes of Mauricie
Tributaries of the Saint-Maurice River
La Tuque, Quebec